Elaine Giftos  (born 1942/1943) is a retired American model, actress, and dancer.

The daughter of Mr. and Mrs. Charles P. Giftos, she attended Pittsfield High School.

While working as a fashion model in New York, Giftos was selected by the Clairol company as Miss Ultra Smooth in 1964. In that role, she traveled around the United States promoting the company's soothing lotion for shaving women's legs. Her work as a photographer's model resulted in photographs of her being used in Ingenue, Redbook, and Seventeen magazines.

Trained by George Balanchine as a member of the New York City Ballet, Giftos performed on the Broadway stage in Leonard Sillman's New Faces of 1968 and Pousse-Café before moving to California to pursue a career in movies and television.

Giftos' first television appearance was in an episode of I Dream of Jeannie ("Jeannie the Matchmaker") as a dating service clerk named Laverne Sadelko, who sets herself up with Roger Healy. Other shows in which she appeared were Bonanza; My Three Sons; The Interns; Ironside; Adam-12; Streets of San Francisco; The Paul Lynde Show; Love, American Style; The Partridge Family in a recurring role as Reuben Kinkcaid's girlfriend Bonnie Kleinschmidt; Kolchak: The Night Stalker; The Bob Newhart Show; The Six Million Dollar Man; Otherworld;  Barney Miller; Three's Company; Hawaii Five-O; Quincy, M.E.; Knight Rider; Magnum, P.I.; Murder, She Wrote; Tales of the Unexpected; War of the Worlds; Ally McBeal; Mars and Beyond and Family Law.

Her movie credits include roles in On a Clear Day You Can See Forever (1970); The Student Nurses (1970); Gas-s-s-s (1970, as the female lead, Cilla); No Drums, No Bugles (1972); Everything You Always Wanted to Know About Sex* (*But Were Afraid to Ask) (1972); The Wrestler (1974); Paternity (1981); Angel (1984); and The Trouble with Dick (1987).

Giftos was married to writer/producer Herbert Wright until his death in 2005.

Since 1989, Giftos Wright has provided feng shui consulting services under the name The Wright Way of Feng Shui.

References

External links
 
 Official website
 The Wright Way of Feng Shui Facebook page
 
 

American film actresses
American television actresses
1945 births
Living people
People from Pittsfield, Massachusetts
Actresses from Massachusetts
American stage actresses
20th-century American actresses
21st-century American women